The men's daoshu / gunshu all-round competition at the 2014 Asian Games in Incheon, South Korea was held on 21 September at the Ganghwa Dolmens Gymnasium.

Schedule
All times are Korea Standard Time (UTC+09:00)

Results
Legend
DNF — Did not finish
DNS — Did not start

References

External links
Official website

Men's daoshu and gunshu